Pedro Agostinho de Neri (born 6 August 1963 in Cabinda) is an Angolan politician, and current secretary-general of the National Assembly of Angola.

References 

Living people
1963 births
Place of birth missing (living people)
MPLA politicians
Colonial people in Angola
Members of the National Assembly (Angola)
21st-century Angolan politicians

People from Cabinda (city)